Four ships of the Royal Navy have been named HMS Endymion after the Greek hero Endymion.

, launched in 1779, was a 44-gun  fifth rate. She was wrecked on a coral reef near the Turks and Caicos Islands on 23 August 1790.
, launched in 1797, was the lead ship of the s. She served in the French Revolutionary and Napoleonic Wars. She became a receiving ship in 1859 and was broken up in June 1868.
, launched in 1865, was a screw frigate. She was decommissioned in 1879 and lent for use as a hospital ship in 1881. Sold out of service in 1885, she was used as an administration ship until 1904, being sold for scrapping in December of that year.
She served in World War I and was broken up in 1921.

Royal Navy ship names